Jacinto is the surname of:

 Andreia Jacinto (born 2002), Portuguese footballer
 António Jacinto (1924–1991), Angolan poet and politician
 Emilio Jacinto (1875–1899), Filipino general during the Philippine Revolution
 Juan Jacinto (born 1978), Dominican judoka
 Ramon Jacinto (born 1945), Filipino businessman, musician, radio TV personality and former government official